Bird Creek is a stream in Hickman County, Tennessee, United States. It is a tributary of Piney River.

Bird Creek was named for William Bird, a pioneer who settled at the creek in 1807.

See also
List of rivers of Tennessee

References

Rivers of Hickman County, Tennessee
Rivers of Tennessee